The Prequel is the fourth extended play by American country singer Luke Combs, released through River House Artists and Columbia Nashville on June 7, 2019. It includes the singles "Beer Never Broke My Heart" and "Even Though I'm Leaving."  All five tracks from The Prequel are included on Combs' album What You See Is What You Get.

Commercial performance
The Prequel debuted at number four on the US Billboard 200 with 48,000 album-equivalent units, of which 22,000 were pure album sales. It is Combs' second US top 10 album. It has sold 42,200 copies in the United States as of September 2019.

Track listing

Personnel
From The Prequel liner notes.

Luke Combs - lead vocals
Jon Conley - acoustic guitar, electric guitar, banjo
Wil Houchens - piano, organ, synthesizer, Wurlitzer
Buddy Leach - saxophone
Sol Philcox-Littlefield - electric guitar
Carl Miner - acoustic guitar, banjo, mandolin
Scott Moffatt - electric guitar, glockenspiel, synthesizer, claps, background vocals
Gary Morse - pedal steel guitar, lap steel guitar
Jerry Roe - drums, percussion
Jimmie Lee Sloas - bass guitar

Charts

Weekly charts

Year-end charts

References

2019 EPs
Luke Combs albums